Jung-gu Office Station is a station of the Daejeon Metro Line 1 in Seonhwa-dong, Jung District, Daejeon, South Korea.

External links
  Jung-gu Office Station from Daejeon Metropolitan Express Transit Corporation

Daejeon Metro stations
Jung District, Daejeon
Railway stations opened in 2006